The Scheibe SF 32 is a German motorglider that was designed by Egon Scheibe in the 1970s.

Design
The SF 32 was similar to the SF 27M but differs in having a Rotax 642 mounted on a pylon, retracted into the fuselage electrically.

Specifications

References

Further reading
 

1970s German sailplanes
Scheibe SF-32
Motor gliders
Single-engined tractor aircraft
Low-wing aircraft
Aircraft first flown in 1976